The Young Sabot Maker is an oil on canvas painting made by Henry Ossawa Tanner in 1895.  Measuring 47 3/8 x 35 3/8 inches (120.3 x 89.9 cm), the painting was purchased by The Nelson-Atkins Museum of Art in 1995.  The painting depicts an older man proudly watching a boy push with his weight against the crossbar handle of a sawhorse to carve a sabot, or wooden shoe.  The two figures stand within the sabot maker's workshop, wood shavings scattered around them on the floor.

Background 
Tanner visited Europe in 1891.  He studied in Paris, enrolling at the Académie Julian, while enjoying a sense of belonging within the city's international and racially diverse community of artists.  During his first summer in France, he traveled to the village of Pont-Aven on Brittany's coast. Brittany was a popular destination for artists, and Tanner became fascinated with his rural French surroundings.  Tanner returned to Philadelphia in 1892, and it was there in 1893 that he began work on The Young Sabot Maker, when he made a number of preliminary studies (see: Related Works).

The figures in The Young Sabot Maker exist within a humble, timeless interior, seemingly apart from the modern world.  Within the composition, Tanner emphasized the inherent dignity and ennobling effect of work that was publicized by important African American educator, Booker T. Washington.  Washington was a family friend who had helped to support Tanner's studies in Paris.  He emphasized the importance of training in skilled manual labor, especially for African Americans, and built this into the curriculum he designed as the president of the Tuskegee Institute in Alabama.

Related works 
Tanner began working on The Young Sabot Maker in Philadelphia in 1893.  A number of preliminary sketches survive, showing the basic format for the final composition.            
 Henry Ossawa Tanner, Study for the Young Sabot Maker, 1893, watercolor and gouache on white wove paper, 15 1/4 x 10 3/16 in. (38.7 x 25.9 cm.).  The Metropolitan Museum of Art.  Purchase, Erving Wolf Foundation Gift and Gift of Hanson K. Corning, by exchange, 1975, 1975.27.2            
 Henry Ossawa Tanner, The Young Sabot Maker, 1893, pastel and ink on paper mounted on paperboard, 10 3/8 x 8 3/8 in. (26.3 x 21.2 cm.).  Smithsonian American Art Museum Gift of H. Alan and Melvin Frank 1983.95.49            
 Henry Ossawa Tanner, Study for the Young Sabot Maker, ca. 1895, oil on canvas, 16 1/4 x 13 in. (41.3 x 33 cm.).  Smithsonian American Art Museum Gift of Mr. and Mrs. Norman Robbins 1983.95.208

External links 
 The Nelson-Atkins Museum of Art collection search result for The Young Sabot Maker
 The Young Sabot Maker in American Paintings to 1945: The Collections of the Nelson-Atkins Museum of Art, volume 1, Margaret C. Conrads, ed. (Kansas City, MO: The Nelson-Atkins Museum of Art, 2007).

1895 paintings
Paintings by Henry Ossawa Tanner